Route 120 is a numbered state highway running  in the U.S. state of Rhode Island. It runs along the Nate Whipple Highway for its entire length. Its western terminus is at Route 122 in Cumberland and the eastern terminus is at the Massachusetts border where it continues as Massachusetts Route 120.

Route description
Route 120 takes the following route through the State:

Cumberland: ; Route 122 to Massachusetts State line at Route 120
Nate Whipple Highway

Major intersections

Notes

Many maps erroneously show Route 120 extending west from Route 122 to Route 146.  Signage very clearly shows this to be incorrect.  The routing shown on most maps continues Route 120 north on Route 122 for about one block, then heading southwest on Manville Hill Road to Route 126, where it travels north with Route 126 to Sayles Hill Road, then southwest on Sayles Hill Road to Route 146.

Though Route 120 does not extend past Route 122, a state-maintained road continues past an interchange with Route 99 to Route 146.

References

External links

2019 Highway Map, Rhode Island

120
Transportation in Providence County, Rhode Island
Cumberland, Rhode Island